Abdelatif Alouach, born August 9, 1976 in Algiers (Algeria) is a French freediving champion and records holder, who has won several world championships in different freediving specialties. He evolved and grew up in Martigues (near Marseille, France). After having been a spearfisherman for many years, today he leads a dual career as a high-level sportsman and freediving instructor within his freediving coaching and training company. Athlete of the FFESSM's Freediving French team since 2018.

PALMARES

2022

2021

2019

2018 
First membership of the FFESSM National French team

References

External links 

 Personal Wesite

Living people
1976 births
French sportsmen
Freedivers
Freediving